Jorge Luis Farjat (born 17th September,  1950) is an Argentinian
producer of audiovisual and literary works, mainly dedicated to his theory about the audiovisual art, which is understood to be the language aesthetics that combines fixed images (photography) with sound, specially music, in a whole organized by a montage and shown under the same conditions than the cinema (movie theater or darkroom camera). His audiovisual works comprise several periods and amount to twenty-six productions of mean and long duration, mostly documentaries. His literary work includes seventeen books which belongs to the Audiovisual Art and Memory Collection, and which are about his audiovisual theory development, the immigration history, and philosophy, such as Migraciones y supervivencia (Migrations and survival. Main excerpts) or, art in general, such as La crisis y deshumanización del arte en el siglo XX. Su manifestación en la música The crisis and dehumanization of art in the 20th century: its representation in music. The books in this collection were declared of cultural interest by the Government of the Province of Buenos Aires.

Biography 
Jorge Luis Farjat was born in San Martín, in the province of Buenos Aires, and showed a tendency towards artistic activities, especially classical music, inherited from his father, and also the cinema, which would take him, during his secondary and tertiary studies, to be in contact with the scholars in said subject, along with his thorough view regarding the different genres and schools. Once he finished his university courses in the Communication Sciences University in the Universidad del Salvador, he specialized in audiovisual production and he immediately started his academic activity concerning that subject. At the beginning of 1970 he met, through Radio Nacional, Martín Gerber Bufano, an Argentinian philosopher, musician and teacher (1921–1986). During the following years, he received from him a deep contact with the music aesthetic psychology and with the Teoría de los Niveles [Levels Theory] which belonged to said author, also inspired in Edward Carpenter,  Albert Ellis and other writers. This intellectual relationship, as well as friendship and, mainly, its fully endorsement with Edward Carpenter's thoughts, became the main element for the entire later development by Farjat, both in the montage musical roots of the works, as well as in the development and expansion of Gerber's Levels Theory, which would be made after the writer's death. After many years of audiovisual and literary productions between 1978 and 2015, the summary and expression of this theory, along with Carpenter's principles, appeared in almost all his publications, whether in the ones of aesthetic origin and also of philosophical and historical origin, having the most complete representation in the book "Los niveles de la experiencia estética. Sinopsis y antología de los principios de la teoría", "The levels of the Aesthetic Experience. Synopsis and anthology of the theories principles", edited at the beginning of 2016.

Audiovisual work

The author's audiovisual art principles  
According to his concepts, "the audiovisual art constitutes a specific means of social communication and expression, since it has intrinsic characteristics and qualities which determine an own language essence, which differentiates it and separates it from the cinema and television, turning it into an experience that aims at a different path, still not explored enough, in the field of communication, with completely new development possibilities in that field. This mainly happens in the audiovisual artistic conception, in which original syntheses and unexpected combinations may take place, which distinguish the audiovisual art as a particular art. Therefore, the audiovisual theme as an art resides in a main interest spot" (Audiovisualogía. El audiovisual como arte y medio de comunicación). Buenos Aires 1979.

Characteristics, influences and philosophical inspiration 
The works are characterized by the use of an image language accompanied, almost constantly, by music that always belongs to composers from the polyphonic, classical and romantic periods and, mainly, the post-romantic period. Therefore, the music role becomes a prevailing role, and it was and still is its inspirational support for building all the works montage. From a more global point of view, his audiovisual works are also intrinsically developed on three overlapped levels: the documentary one, which is related, among others, to the testimonial genre, the formal one, which has to do with the purely aesthetic aspect, and a third sense connected in the second one's essence and spread towards a psychological expression, which replaces the purely intellectual one, whose features are established by Jorge Luis Farjat in his books Teoría Audiovisual Audiovisual Theory, Migraciones y Supervivencia Migrations and survival. Main excerpts, El audiovisual y las artes The Audiovisual Theme and the Arts y Los niveles de la experiencia estética. Sinopsis y antología de los principios de la teoría. The levels of the Aesthetic Experience. Synopsis and anthology of the theories principles. Philosophically, great part of his work is inspired by the writer, poet and philosopher. Edward Carpenter (1844–1929) and many of his jobs make up metaphorical expressions of the essays and poems written by said author. Two of his works are built on the foundations that will sustain all his creations from its roots: "Después de la civilización" (After civilization), which belongs to "Towards Democracy" (London 1907) and "El drama del amor y la muerte. Un Estudio de la Evolución y Transfiguración humanas" (The drama of love and death. A Study of Human Evolution and Transfiguration) (London 1912).

Periods of the audiovisual works

First period (1976-1979) 

It includes "El Arte de Vivir" (The Art of Living), the trilogy "Hacia las Regiones del Sol" (Toward the Regions of the Sun), "El Mundo Estelar" (The Starry World) and Indicios de Inmortalidad (Intimation of immortality). The works during this period have an image language only accompanied by the aforementioned music. However, and in a relatively timeless level, "El Arte de Vivir" (The Art of Living), also has semidocumentary characteristics. Their literary inspiration is fully based on Edward Carpenter and William Wordsworth. This initial stage coincides with the Audiovisual Theory divulgation, through the first publication of the book "Audiovisualogía. El Audiovisual como Arte y Medio de Comunicación". "El Audiovisual y las Artes" (The Audiovisual Theme and the Arts), an essay supplementary to the previous book, concludes the investigational spread of the topic during these first years and it has just been published in 2015.

Second period (1989-1993) 

It indicates Farjat's arrival at the documentary genre, with the incorporation of the historical-testimonial theme to the montage methods previously explained. Aesthetically, these works are made based on their main characters’ story, but the music-image style from the previous period still has an important percentage of the total actual time of each work (half of it or more than its half). From this period on, and more specifically as from the audiovisual work "Memorias del Hospital de Inmigrantes" (Memories of the Immigrants’ Hospital), the works start to be developed in these three aforementioned levels: the documentary one, exclusively related to the historical-testimonial context, the formal one, which has to do with the purely aesthetic aspect, and a third sense referred to the one that established its features in the abovementioned literary essays. "Las Edades en el Viento" (Ages in the Wind), es:Liebig, historia (Path of Lights)] and his final work "El Enigma de las Grandes Voces." (The Enigma of the Great Voices) are also part of this cycle.

Third period (1993-1998) 

It represents a substantial core, since it is the grounds for a new aesthetic outline, expressed in other ways of montage which forced the author to develop more widely the principles shown in Audiovisualogía (Audiovisualogy). These six years conformed to that aesthetic development and a new set of audiovisual works, gathered in "La Exhalación de la Tierra" (The Exhalation of the Earth), which comprises a total of fourteen works. Some of them became the constant metaphorical expression about Carpenter's thoughts. Thus, "Preludio" (Prelude) reviews the awareness degrees topic, while "El Encuentro de la Luz" (The Encounter with light) is related to "Sobre la Creación y Materialización de las Formas" (On the Creation and Materialisation of Forms), addressed by this author in one of the corresponding chapters in the book "El drama del amor y la muerte, un estudio de la evolución y transfiguración humanas" (The drama of love and death. A Study of Human Evolution and Transfiguration) (London 1912). During this period, the documentary, photographic and testimonial stage is carried out, as well as the montage script about the music of the selected works. From the aesthetics point of view, the works which compose "La Exhalación de la Tierra" (The Exhalation of the Earth) are fully developed only on the music and image style, as in the first works, though with a strong documentary reference. Besides, in 1998, already at the end of this cycle, he produces "La Creación. Historia de Svea" (The Creation. History of Svea). In this work, the new acquired linguistic styles which are applied in this period are perceived. "La Creación" (The Creation) gathers fourteen of those intrinsic and extrinsic narrative formats of montage, now progressively articulated according to the extrinsic fading connection which shapes all the work.

Fourth period  (1999-2007) 

Through the illustrated literary essay Migraciones y Supervivencia (Migrations and survival. Main excerpts) publication, the author completely brings together the series of philosophical principles that inspire the basic substance of a great part of his audiovisual work. He continues dedicating this period to the montage of works collected under the title "La Exhalación de la Tierra" (The Exhalation of the Earth).

Fifth period (2007- 2014) 

It starts with the audiovisual work "Solar de Arte y Memoria Audiovisual (Solar of Audiovisual Art and Memory)" which, accompanied by a literary essay with the same name, reflects in a documentary way the architectonic work that also belongs to the author, made according to the same aesthetic and philosophical principles which inspire the audiovisual work. The Solar, after long years of being designed and executed, became a Museum and Library. From the beginning, this period is characterized by the aesthetic features of the previous one, but this time highlighted by the inevitable technological conversion to the digital media, including the reprography of the works from the previous periods. The new digital works use aspect relationships that, although they do not exclude the prior classical one, admit other new ones such as the 16:9. By the end of 2010, he produces "Light from the blue", an audiovisual work carried out like a short interval, and he starts a long-length trilogy called "Una Voz sobre la Tierra" (A Voice over the Earth)], which is about nature and whose first and second part production extended until the end of 2013. Meanwhile, the author still captures in a literary way the Audiovisual Art foundations, in which the second and main stage of his theory is summarized. These grounds were developed as from 1993 and they were greatly construed when applying the new formats of the visual and sound montage in his works. In 2013 he also produces the digital version of the Prelude of "La Exhalación de la Tierra", which belongs to his Fourth period of works, whereas at the beginning of 2014 he finishes "Life steeped by shades of red", an audiovisual work that continues with the theme in "Una Voz sobre la Tierra" (A Voice over the Earth). Simultaneously, with his habitual montage about music, new ways are incorporated to the montage theory. During the same year, he produces the digital version of "El encuentro de la luz" (The Encounter with light), an audiovisual work of the "La exhalación de la Tierra" (The Exhalation of the Earth) series, which also belongs to his Fourth period of works. Moreover, he creates "Autumn song" (Light and color steeped of yellow), which thematically follows the previous "Life steeped by shades of red." This period finishes by producing the digital version of "El eterno anhelo (The infinite yearning)", which belongs to the same series than "La Exhalación de la Tierra" (The Exhalation of the Earth) and that Fourth period of works.

Sixth period works  (2015- ) 

The beginning of this new period is actually marked by a substantial change in the aspects connected with the aesthetic grounds of his Audiovisual Theory, which are related to the extrinsic montage, in which the author leaves aside what he calls "extrinsic association point due the lap dissolve understood as free will", going to a new formalist accuracy, which is a hypothesis developed in his simultaneous writings. This period starts with "El jardín secreto. Lo imperceptible en invierno" (The Secret Garden. Invisible in winter), "The great down", and "Spring Music" edited in 2015, as from the documentary material from the previous year. On the other hand, he concludes the third part of his trilogy called "Una voz sobre La Tierra" (A Voice over the Earth), In July 2015, he publishes his literary work 'El audiovisual y las artes' (The Audiovisual Theme and the Arts), which establishes the relationship of the audiovisual art with the other arts, proposing their hierarchy according to an aesthetic psychology which lays the foundations for the finishing limits a person can access, through a deepening scale, and combining his comparison in relation to that hierarchy. The work ends with an appendix and other main aspects to be considered in an artistic work analysis, and it is concluded in 2016 with Los niveles de la experiencia estética. Sinopsis y antología de los principios de la teoría (The levels of the Aesthetic Experience. Synopsis and anthology of the theories principles).

Works identifications 

All the works can be found on full HD digital support (1080p), in new aspect relation 16:9, and in the process of being converted to 4K, including the ones which were digitalized that belonged to the author's first periods (from the First to the Fourth period), in which he produced his works on color reversible film 35 mm.

First period 

 El Arte de vivir – The Art of Living
• 1975-1976 • 100 minutes
 Hacia las Regiones del Sol (Trilogía) – Toward the Regions of the Sun (Trilogy)
• 1976-1977 • 240 minutes
 El Mundo Estelar – The Starry World
• 1977-1978 • 80 minutes
 Indicios de Inmortalidad – Intimations of Immortality
• 1977 • 80 minutes

Second period 

 Los Antiguos Hoteles de Inmigrantes – The Old Immigrants’ Hotels 
• 1989 • 33 minutes
 Memorias del Hospital de Inmigrantes – Memories of the Immigrants’ Hospital
• 1990 • 90 minutes
 Las Edades en el Viento – Ages in the Wind
• 1991 • 30 minutes
El Sendero de las Luces (Historia de Liebig) – Path of Lights (History of Liebig)
• 1991 • 60 minutes
 Memorias de la Colonia San José – Memories from the San José Colony
• 1993 • 45 minutes
 El Enigma de las Grandes Voces – The Enigma of the Great Voices
• 1991-1993 • 90 minutes

Third period 

 La Exhalación de la Tierra. Serie de Obras Audiovisuales – The Exhalation of the Earth Series of several Works (Started in 1993)
 El Gran Hogar – The Great Home
 La Cuesta Morada – The Purple Slope
 Hornos de las bajas luces I y II – Low Light Furnaces
 La Común Unión – The Common Union
  El Son de Badajo – The Melody of the Clapper
 Hornos en Lejanos Ponientes - Furnaces in Distant Dusks
 Luces en la Cresta – Lights at the summit
 El llamado en el camino – The call along the road
 Las Líneas y las Sombras – The Lines and The Shadows
 El Encuentro de la Luz – The Encounter with light
 Evocaciones a la Vera de los Senderos – Evocation along the edge of the trails
 El eterno anhelo – The infinite yearning
 Preludio Farjat – Prelude
 Largo Final – Long finale
 La Creación (Historia de Svea) – The Creation (History of Svea)

Fourth period 

"La Exhalación de la Tierra" (Continuation of works) Audiovisual works of this long-length series, digitalized between 2013 and 2014:

 La Exhalación de la Tierra
‹Preludio›

• 49 minutes • Digital version made in 2013

 El encuentro de la luz
• 40 minutes • Digital version made in 2014

 El eterno anhelo - The infinite yearning
• 38 minutes • Image edition and digital sound - 2014

Fifth period 

 Solar de Arte y Memoria Audiovisual – (Solar of Audiovisual Art and Memory)
• 2007 • 30 minutes
 Luz del Azul– (Light from the blue)
• 2011 • 14 minutes
 Una voz sobre la Tierra –  (A Voice over the Earth) First and second part.
• 2013 • 100 minutes
 Life steeped by shades of red.
• 2013-2014 • 41 minutes
 Autumn song – (Light and color steeped of yellow)
• 2014 • 23 minutes

Sixth period 

 El jardín secreto Lo imperceptible en invierno
• 2015 • 20 minutes
 The great down
• 2015 • 14 minutes
 Una voz sobre la Tierra (Third part)
• 2015 • 32 minutes
 Spring Music
• 2015 • 27 minutes

Literary work

Works along with Graciela Swiderski 

 La Inmigración (The Immigration). Buenos Aires - 1st edition 1999. / 
 La Inmigración. Historia Ilustrada y Memoria Audiovisual Los Antiguos Hoteles de Inmigrantes. The Immigration Cultured History and Audiovisual Memory. The Olds Immigrants´ Hotels. Buenos Aires - 2nd edition 2001./ 
 Los Antiguos Hoteles de Inmigrantes (The Old Immigrants’ Hotels). Buenos Aires - 1st edition 2000. /  
 Los Viajes y Arribos The Immigration. Cultured History and Audiovisual Memory. Voyages and Arrivals. Buenos Aires - 2nd edition 2003. /

Own works 
 Audiovisualogía El audiovisual como arte y medio de comunicación (Audiovisualogy. The Audiovisual as Art and Mean of Communication). Buenos Aires – 1st edition  1979. /  .
 Obras Varias (in one volume) Obra Audiovisual  Selección Iconográfica Citas y Testimonios. El Audiovisual como Arte Identificación de Obras (Quotations and testimonials. The Audiovisual as art. Identification of the Works) Migraciones y Supervivencia Principales Extractos (Migrations and survival. Main excerpts) Buenos Aires – 1st edition 2003. / .
 Obra Audiovisual Selección (Iconográfica Audiovisual Work Iconographic Selection). Buenos Aires – 1st edition 2002. / .
 Citas y Testimonios. El Audiovisual como Arte Identificación de Obras (Quotations and testimonials. The Audiovisual as art. Identification of the Works). Buenos Aires - 1st edition 2002 / 
 Migraciones y Supervivencia Principales Extractos (Migrations and survival. Main excerpts) Buenos Aires – 1st edition 2002 / 
 Teoría Audiovisual (Audiovisual Theory). Buenos Aires – 1st edition 2004/ , 2nd edition.
 Teoría y Obra Audiovisual (Audiovisual work and Theory). Buenos Aires – 1st edition 2004 / 
 Solar de Arte y Memoria Audiovisual (Solar of Audiovisual Art and Memory) Buenos Aires - 1st edition 2008 / 
 La crisis y deshumanización del arte en el siglo XX: su manifestación en la música (The crisis and dehumanization of art in the 20th century: its representation in music.). Buenos Aires – 1st edition 2011. 2nd edition 2015.
 El Audiovisual y las Artes (The Audiovisual Theme and the Arts). Buenos Aires – 1st edition 2015 / . Declared of cultural interest by the Buenos Aires Province Government. Res. 22 
 La música en la crisis y deshumanización del arte contemporáneo (The music in the crisis and the dehumanization of contemporary art.). Buenos Aires – 1st edition 2015 / . Declared of cultural interest by the Buenos Aires Province Government. Res. 22.
 El Arte Audiovisual: fotografías proyectadas unidas al sonido. Antología de principios estéticos y antecedentes históricos (The audiovisual art: photographs projected together with sound. Anthology of aesthetic principles and historical background). Buenos Aires. Colección de Arte y Memoria Audiovisual. 1st edition, 2015. Declared of cultural interest by the Buenos Aires Province Government. Res. 22   
 Los Niveles de la Experiencia estética: sinopsis y antología de los principios de la teoría (The levels of the Aesthetic Experience. Synopsis and anthology of the principles of the theories). Buenos Aires. Colección de Arte y Memoria Audiovisual. 1st edition, 2016. 
 Obra Audiovisual. Selección Iconográfica. Períodos 2007-2016. Audiovisual Work. Iconographic Selection. Periods 2007-2016. Buenos Aires. Colección de Arte y Memoria Audiovisual. 1st edition, 2016.

Other published works 
 Migraciones: Más de una década de difusión histórico documental. Brochure for the Dirección Nacional de Migraciones [Argentinian Immigration Office]. Ministry of the Interior. 1987-1999.

Activities in different fields 
Dirección Nacional de Migraciones [Argentinian Immigration Office]:
Among 1989 and 2001, he develops a plan of testimonial historical divulgation of the migratory act in the Dirección Nacional de Migraciones where, between 1990 and 1992, he organizes and runs said institution Museum, acting as the coordinator of the commission in charge of collecting related pieces and documents (Resol, DNM 3753).

Solar de Arte y Memoria Audiovisual [Solar of Audiovisual Memory and Art]: El Solar de Arte y Memoria Audiovisual was designed and architectonically made by the author. Along with his audiovisual work and with the theory related to it, the Solar is the material expression he has taken advantage of also to enter into the architectonic field the set of philosophical concepts which provide for all his creation; these themes are also materialized in his literary works. When designing the space, he tried to integrate the architecture with the natural view, both animal and vegetal. He has made a union of elements corresponding to different classical architectonic trends, making up an eclectic style.

Asociación Arte y Memoria Audiovisual [Association of Audiovisual Memory and Art]: In 2007, he establishes the Asociación Arte y Memoria Audiovisual; the divulgation of the audiovisual art as an art and means of communication is among its main purposes. The diffusion of the audiovisual art as an art and means of communication, didactic instrument
and one of sociocultural inquiry, its theoretical investigation as an art and 
in favor of recovering the memory, together with the preservation of 
the Solar of Audiovisual Art and Memory, where the Museum, 
Library and Center of Investigation are located, were declared as activities of cultural interest by the Government of the Province of Buenos Aires (Resolution. No. 177/07).

Bibliographic sources 
 Farjat, Jorge Luis. Audiovisualogía. El audiovisual como arte y medio de comunicación (Audiovisualogy. The Audiovisual as Art and Mean of Communication). Buenos Aires: Audiovisual Art and Memory Collection, 1979.
 Farjat, Jorge Luis. Obra Audiovisual. Selección Iconográfica (Audiovisual Work. Iconographic Selection). Buenos Aires: Audiovisual Art and Memory Collection, 2003.
 Farjat, Jorge Luis. Teoría Audiovisual (Audiovisual Theory). Buenos Aires: Audiovisual Art and Memory Collection, 2004.
 Farjat, Jorge Luis. Citas y testimonios. El audiovisual como arte. Identificación de obras. (Quotations and testimonials. The Audiovisual as art. Identification of the Works). Buenos Aires: Audiovisual Art and Memory Collection, 2002.
 Farjat, Jorge Luis. El audiovisual y las artes. Audiovisual Art and Memory Collection. Buenos Aires. 2015

References

Argentine people of Lebanese descent
Argentine artists
Argentine writers
Living people
1950 births